Dmitri Vazhayevich Kobesov (born 31 July 1998) is a Russian football player. He plays for PFC Dynamo Stavropol.

Club career
He made his debut in the Russian Football National League for FC Alania Vladikavkaz on 8 August 2020 in a game against FC Chayka Peschanokopskoye, as a starter.

References

External links
 
 Profile by Russian Football National League
 

1998 births
Sportspeople from Vladikavkaz
Living people
Russian footballers
Association football defenders
FC Spartak Vladikavkaz players
FC Dynamo Stavropol players